Steve Kindel (born February 25, 1977) is a Canadian soccer player who currently plays for Surrey United Firefighters.

Career

Club
Kindel was a former standout at Simon Fraser University, where he won the 1997 NAIA Pacific Northwest Conference Player of the Year. After CIS soccer he turned pro by signing with the Vancouver Whitecaps in 1997 where he would play until 1998. After USL soccer he left for Europe where he had a brief stint with R.A.E.C. Mons of the Belgian Third Division A. The same year he made his debut with the Canada national soccer team, where in total he would earn 4 caps.

Kindel returned to the USL First Division first playing with the Richmond Kickers in 1999, then with the Hampton Roads Mariners in 2000. Midway through the season Kindel returned to Vancouver and re-signed with the club at the USL First Division roster freeze on August 1, 2000. In 2001 and 2002 he finished second in scoring and was named into the Second Team All A-League. the same two seasons he won the Vancouver Gerry Nakatsuka Midfielder of the Year award.

During the 2005 season he was converted into a left back by Bob Lilley. Where he logged 2, 381 minutes only second to Martin Nash. He was also awarded the first ever Jack MacDonald Unsung Hero award. In 2006, he helped the Whitecaps claim their first USL First Division Championship by beating the Rochester Rhinos 2–0. On 12 October 2008 he helped the Whitecaps capture their second USL First Division Championship beating the Puerto Rico Islanders 2–1 in Vancouver He was released on 8 December 2008 by Vancouver Whitecaps. On July 23, 2009 the Rochester Rhinos announced the signing of Kindel a one-year deal. After his releasing by Rochester Rhinos in the USL First Division, he signed with Surrey United Firefighters.

International
Kindel played at the 1997 FIFA World Youth Championship in Malaysia, alongside Paul Stalteri and Jason Bent. He won 10 caps with the Canadian U-23 team.

He made his senior debut for Canada in a May 1998 friendly match against Macedonia and earned a total of 4 caps, scoring no goals. His final international was a July 1999 friendly match against Saudi Arabia.

Coaching
Kindel was the long time Technical Director of Vancouver United Football Club and its predecessor Dunbar Soccer Association before accepting a Technical Director position at North Vancouver Football Club in the summer of 2012 to present. Both are two of the biggest clubs in western Canada. He also coached the Surrey United Women's Premier team to six consecutive BC Provincial Cup titles and multiple Canadian Club National metals including Gold in 2006. Kindel also has experience coaching various boys elite teams in the Vancouver area. He currently holds a Canadian B National Certificate.

Honors

Canada
CONCACAF U-20 Championship (1): 1996

Vancouver Whitecaps FC
USL First Division Championship (2): 2006, 2008

References

External links

1977 births
Living people
Sportspeople from Burnaby
Association football defenders
Soccer people from British Columbia
Canadian soccer players
Canada men's international soccer players
Canadian expatriate sportspeople in the United States
Canadian expatriate soccer players
Canadian expatriate sportspeople in Belgium
Simon Fraser Clan men's soccer players
Vancouver Whitecaps (1986–2010) players
R.A.E.C. Mons players
Richmond Kickers players
Virginia Beach Mariners players
Rochester New York FC players
USL First Division players
Expatriate footballers in Belgium
Expatriate soccer players in the United States
Vancouver Columbus players
Simon Fraser University alumni
Canada men's youth international soccer players
Canada men's under-23 international soccer players